Kashmiri Bazaar is a traditional market located in Lahore, Pakistan. It is known for Kashmiri handicrafts, textiles, and traditional products. Locals and visitors buy shawls, rugs, and other textiles at the bazaar.

References

Bazaars in Lahore
Market towns in Pakistan
Tourist attractions in Lahore
Shopping districts and streets in Pakistan